Linas Vaitkus (born 24 March 1973) is an American-Lithuanian alpine skier.

In 1998, Vaitkus represented Lithuania in 1998 Winter Olympic Games where he finished 25th in downhill.

References 

Lithuanian male alpine skiers
1973 births
Olympic alpine skiers of Lithuania
Alpine skiers at the 1998 Winter Olympics
Living people